The Swedish National Agency for Higher Education was a  Government agency in Sweden. It was in charge of inspecting and promoting higher education sector activities, through follow-up and evaluation of higher education, quality assessment, initiatives for updating teaching methods and assessment of right to award academic degrees. Included among the responsibilities of the agency was the Swedish Scholastic Aptitude Test.

As of 1 January 2013, Högskoleverket no longer exists; two new government authorities, the Swedish Council for Higher Education (Universitets- och högskolerådet) and the Swedish Higher Education Authority (Universitetskanslerämbetet) have taken over its responsibilities.

See also 
Education in Sweden
List of universities in Sweden
Swedish Research Council
Swedish National Board of Student Aid
Government agencies in Sweden

External links 
Swedish National Agency for Higher Education - Official site

Regulation in Sweden
Education in Sweden
Defunct government agencies of Sweden
2013 disestablishments in Sweden
Higher education authorities
Government agencies disestablished in 2013